John Greenleaf Whittier School, No. 33 is a historic school building located at Indianapolis, Indiana.  The original section was built in 1890, and is a two-story, rectangular, Romanesque Revival style brick building with limestone trim. It has a limestone foundation and a decked hip roof with Queen Anne style dormers.  A rear addition was constructed in 1902, and a gymnasium and auditorium addition in 1927.

It was listed on the National Register of Historic Places in 1981.

References

School buildings on the National Register of Historic Places in Indiana
Queen Anne architecture in Indiana
Romanesque Revival architecture in Indiana
School buildings completed in 1890
Schools in Indianapolis
National Register of Historic Places in Indianapolis